Muslim warfare may refer to
Early Muslim conquests
Holy war in Islam
Jihad
Islamic military jurisprudence
Medieval Muslim treatises on military arts, see Furusiyya